St. Francis De Sales College, also known as SFS College, Nagpur, established in 1956, is a general degree college in Nagpur, Maharashtra. This college offers different courses in science and arts. It is affiliated to Rashtrasant Tukadoji Maharaj Nagpur University.

Departments

Science
Physics
Chemistry
Mathematics
Statistics
Biochemistry
Biotechnology
Electronics
Botany
Zoology
Computer Science

Arts
Marathi
English
Hindi
History
Political Science
Economics
Sociology
Philosophy

Accreditation
The college is  recognized by the University Grants Commission (UGC).

References

External links
http://www.sfscollege.edu.in

Colleges affiliated to Rashtrasant Tukadoji Maharaj Nagpur University
Educational institutions established in 1956
1956 establishments in Bombay State
Universities and colleges in Maharashtra
Universities and colleges in Nagpur